Podocarpus roraimae is a species of conifer in the family Podocarpaceae. It is found only in Venezuela.

References

roraimae
Least concern plants
Endemic flora of Venezuela
Taxonomy articles created by Polbot
Flora of the Tepuis